The 7-demicubic honeycomb, or demihepteractic honeycomb is a uniform space-filling tessellation (or honeycomb) in Euclidean 7-space. It is constructed as an alternation of the regular 7-cubic honeycomb.

It is composed of two different types of facets. The 7-cubes become alternated into 7-demicubes h{4,3,3,3,3,3} and the alternated vertices create 7-orthoplex {3,3,3,3,3,4} facets.

D7 lattice 
The vertex arrangement of the 7-demicubic honeycomb is the D7 lattice. The 84 vertices of the rectified 7-orthoplex vertex figure of the 7-demicubic honeycomb reflect the kissing number 84 of this lattice. The best known is 126, from the E7 lattice and the 331 honeycomb.

The D packing (also called D) can be constructed by the union of two D7 lattices. The D packings form lattices only in even dimensions. The kissing number is 26=64 (2n-1 for n<8, 240 for n=8, and 2n(n-1) for n>8).
 ∪ 

The D lattice (also called D and C) can be constructed by the union of all four 7-demicubic lattices: It is also the 7-dimensional body centered cubic, the union of two 7-cube honeycombs in dual positions.
 ∪  ∪  ∪  =  ∪ .

The kissing number of the D lattice is 14 (2n for n≥5) and its Voronoi tessellation is a quadritruncated 7-cubic honeycomb, containing all with tritruncated 7-orthoplex,  Voronoi cells.

Symmetry constructions 

There are three uniform construction symmetries of this tessellation. Each symmetry can be represented by arrangements of different colors on the 128 7-demicube facets around each vertex.

See also 
7-cubic honeycomb

References 
 Coxeter, H.S.M. Regular Polytopes, (3rd edition, 1973), Dover edition, 
 pp. 154–156: Partial truncation or alternation, represented by h prefix: h{4,4}={4,4}; h{4,3,4}={31,1,4}, h{4,3,3,4}={3,3,4,3}, ...
 Kaleidoscopes: Selected Writings of H. S. M. Coxeter, edited by F. Arthur Sherk, Peter McMullen, Anthony C. Thompson, Asia Ivic Weiss, Wiley-Interscience Publication, 1995,  
 (Paper 24) H.S.M. Coxeter, Regular and Semi-Regular Polytopes III, [Math. Zeit. 200 (1988) 3-45]

Notes

External links 

Honeycombs (geometry)
8-polytopes